Barwaha is a municipality and tehsil in Khargone district in the state of Madhya Pradesh, India. Barwaha is second biggest city of District after Khargone city. The Barwaha city is divided into 18 wards for which elections are held every 5 years. The Barwaha Municipality has population of 39,973 of which 20,940 are males while 19,033 are females as per report released by Census India 2011. Literacy rate of Barwaha is 87.27% higher than state average of 69.32%. In Barwaha, Male literacy is around 92.73% while female literacy rate is 81.23%.

Barwaha Municipality has total administration over 5,133 houses to which it supplies basic amenities like water and sewerage. It is also authorized to build roads within Municipality limits and impose taxes on properties coming under its jurisdiction. The city is situated on the banks of the Narmada River.  It has got the largest CISF training campus in India. The city is surrounded by hundreds of very small villages and so is the main market area for those villages. On every Tuesday people from all these villages come to purchase their weekly required materials, whereas on Friday most of the shops remain closed.

Barwaha is well connected to Maharashtra, Rajasthan and Gujarat through various state highways and rail route.

Barwaha is famous for cotton production and cotton ginning factories. Two things are very famous here: Lime of Barwah and Chivda(चिवड़ा) of Barwaha.

It is also an important industrial city with several calcium, ginning, agro, bag, textile industries. One alcohol and beer factory is also here.

History
Barwaha is a municipality in the District of Khargone is situated in the state of Madhya Pradesh in the central region of India. Khargone was formerly known as West Nimar. A part of the Indore Division lying on the region of Nimar, The District headquarters is located in the city of Khargone along with other functional offices i.e., police station, the collectorate office, telecom and other governmental organizations. 

In ancient times, the Haihayas of Mahishmati (present-day Maheshwar) ruled this region. In early medieval age, the area was under the Paramaras of Malwa and the Ahirs of Asirgarh. In late medieval age, the area was under Malwa Sultanate of Mandu. In 1531, Gujarat sultan Bahadur Shah brought this area under his control. In 1562, Akbar annexed this territory along with the whole Malwa to Mughal empire. In 1740 Marathas under the Peshwa brought the area under their control. In 1778, Peshwa distributed this territory to the Maratha rulers, Holkars of Indore, Sindhias of Gwalior and Ponwars of Dhar. At the time of Maratha rulers Barwaha comes under Holkar reign. Barwaha is considered to be the holiday place by the Maharajah of Indore in pre-independent British India. 

During the reign of Mughal emperor Shahjahan, Rana Durjansal of Tomar Dynasty received the Zamindari of Jaitpuri (Barwaha) in the year 1646. In the year 1758 Shivaji Rao Holkar of Holkar Dynasty built the longest palace of Asia the Dariya Mahal at Barwaha which is now an important administration building of CISF RTC Barwaha. 

After the independence and merger of the princely states with Union of India in 1948, this territory became West Nimar district of Madhya Bharat. On 1 November 1956 this district became part of the newly formed state of Madhya Pradesh. On 25 May 1998 West Nimar district was bifurcated into two districts: Khargone and Barwani and Barwaha comes under Khargone District.

Barwaha is known for its ghats and is built on the banks of Narmada River, Choral River and river Padali surrounded by Ujjain, Indore and Dewas as its northern frontier, the state of Maharashtra Khandwa and Burhanpur as the southern side and Khargone and Barwani as the Western border. The people of Barwaha speak Namadi. It is the primary language in west Nimar, Bareli and Palya, the language of Bhil is spoken  in the central territory of Madhya Pradesh; Bareli Rathwi, Bhil is written in Bhilali and  Devanagari script.

The city was an important industrial city during the British Raj.

Geography
Barwaha is located in the south-west border of Madhya Pradesh 283 metres (928 ft) above sea level. The city is connected to the cities of Indore, Khandwa, Dewas, Ujjain, Burhanpur, Dhar, Hoshangabad and towns of Khargone, Barwani, Mhow, Sanawad, Maheshwar, Dhamnod, Omkareshwar, Alirajpur, Manawar by road. The town has a meter-gauge railway line connecting Barwaha-Mhow. The nearest airport is located at Indore. The nearest main railway station is located at Indore and Khandwa.

Transport
Air

The Airport close to Barwaha is at Indore (60 km).

Rail

Barwaha railway station is situated on Mhow - Omkareshwar Road Passenger line, which is the largest remaining meter gauge line in India. Recently gauge conversion started on this line. After conversion it will connect Indore to south India.

Road

Barwaha is very well connected with other parts of the state. It is connected by road with Indore, Ujjain, Khandwa, Burhanpur, Barwani, Dhamnod, Omkareshwar, Khargone, Khategaon, Bhopal . It is situated at the junction of SH-38 and SH-27.

Education
The city has good CBSE as well as Board of Secondary Education, Madhya Pradesh schools.

Religious demography
The population of Barwaha city is 74.79% Hindu, 18.38% Muslim, 4.30% Jain, 2.08% Sikh and 0.29% Christian & 0.11% Buddhism.

Culture
Various cultural activities are held throughout the year. Residents of the city, belonging to different religions, celebrate various festivals such as Diwali, Eid, Holi, Christmas etc. with harmony and peace. Other than the regular festivals, certain festivals are local to the region such as Gangor, which is celebrated by many people.

There are many other cultural events held in the city throughout the year. There are various book fairs, art fairs, etc. Many local festivals celebrated with joy and happiness, such as 'Nag Panchami' (a day celebrated for snakes which are respected and worshipped like a god in Hindu mythology), or Bhagoriya (a festival celebrated by tribal people in the region).

Narmada Jayanti

Narmada Jayanti is held in Barwaha. A grand ceremony is organized every year on the eve of Narmada Jayanti. The festival held every year at the banks of Narmada River. During this event, different arts and cultural programs are held, such as displays of different dance forms and the cultural aspects of Nimar. The main attraction of this event is "PUSHP-VARSHA"(From the air Tulips of rose is spread using HELICOPTER) over all the 
Devotee present on the occasion of birthday of Maa Narmada. Many tourists attend the event every year.

Nimar Utsav

Nimar Utsav is another event held in Nimar. As the name suggests, it is the 'utsav' (celebration) or the festival held every year at the banks of Narmada River. During this event, different arts and cultural programs are held, such as displays of different dance forms and the cultural aspects of Nimar. Many tourists attend the event every year.

Rangpanchmi

Rangpanchami is celebrated five days after Dulendi or Holi, and has much bigger importance in Barwaha than main Holi festival itself. and is celebrated by people in their own distinct style. Here, it is celebrated like Dulendi, but natural colors with or without water are thrown out in the air or poured on others for the whole day by youngsters all over the city. On the event of the festival, the local municipal corporation sprinkles color mixed water on the main streets of Barwaha. Earlier Fire Brigade vehicles were used for this purpose. This stylized Rangpanchami celebration in Barwaha holds back its roots in the Holkar Reign and continues to be celebrated with the same vigor till date.

Business 
Calcium factories played a huge role in business of Barwaha in old times. 

Cotton ginning factories are also in city which are very important for economic development of Barwaha region. 

There are about 310 villages in Barwaha Tehsil/Block, which is making the city a biggest market of Barwaha, Sanawad, Maheshwar, Mandleshwar and Omkareshwar region. 

The city has 4 industrial areas:
 North Industrial Area – Indore Road 
 South Industrial Area – Narmada Road
 West Industrial Area – Ahmedabad Road
 North-east Industrial Area – Bhopal Road

Tourist attractions
There are many tourist attractions in Barwaha.

Jayanti Mata Temple

Jayanti Mata Temple is also a well-visited tourist attraction.

Shri Dada Darbar

The city also has a museum and hospital. It is named after Dadaji Dhuniwale, a mystic who lived in the town of Khandwa and healed people's miseries in uncommon way.

Narmada River

The Narmada River also called the Rewa River in central India and the fifth longest river in the Indian subcontinent. It is the fourth longest river that flows entirely within India, after the Ganga, the Godavari River, and the Krishna River. It is also known as "Life Line of Madhya Pradesh" for its huge contribution to the state of Madhya Pradesh in many ways.

Narmada Kothi (Maharajah of Indore Retreat Palace)

The Narmada Kothi (Maharajah of Indore Retreat Palace) is a Palace in the Indian municipality of Barwaha, it was constructed by the Maharajah of Indore as a Retreat Palace and used by him and his family to enjoy their holidays and take breaks from duties of ruling and managing the Princely State of Indore in pre-independent British India. The palace was built in European style.

Dense Forest

The city is also surrounded by dense forest which is also a tourist attraction. Many people come here to celebrate Holi and RangPanchmai.

References 

Cities and towns in Khargone district
Tourist attractions in Khargone district